Ascendance of a Bookworm is an anime series based on a light novel and manga series written by Miya Kazuki and illustrated by Yō Shiina. The series is animated by Ajia-do Animation Works and directed by Mitsuru Hongo, with Mariko Kunisawa handling series composition, Yoshiaki Yanagida and Toshihisa Kaiya designing the characters, and Michiru composing the series' music. The first season ran for 14 episodes, which aired from October 3 to December 26, 2019 on ABC, Tokyo MX, Wowow, and BS Fuji. The opening theme is  performed by Sumire Morohoshi, while the ending theme is  performed by Megumi Nakajima.  The first season's OVA episode (numbered 14.5) consisting of two parts called "Eustachius's Incognito Operation Downtown" and "Visiting Missus Corinna" aired on March 9, 2020. The second season ran for 12 episodes, which aired from April 5 to June 21, 2020. The production of the third season was announced on July 12, 2020, which ran for 10 episodes, and aired from April 12 to June 14, 2022 on ytv. Crunchyroll is streaming the series.

Series overview

Episode list

Season 1 (2019)

Season 2 (2020)

Season 3 (2022)

Notes

References 

Ascendance of a Bookworm